Propionicimonas is a Gram-positive, non-spore-forming and facultatively anaerobic bacterial genus from the family Propionibacteriaceae.

References

Further reading 
 

Propionibacteriales
Bacteria genera